Kamena Vourla is a town and a municipality in Phthiotis, Greece. At the 2011 local government reform it became part of the municipality Molos-Agios Konstantinos (of which it became the seat), which was renamed to Kamena Vourla in July 2018. The population of the town proper was 2,796 at the 2011 census.

Geography

The Knimis mountains rise just south of the town. It is crossed by Motorway 1, which connects Athens and Thessaloniki.

The municipality Kamena Vourla comprises the municipal units Kamena Vourla, Agios Konstantinos and Molos. The municipal unit Kamena Vourla consists of the communities Kamena Vourla, Kainourgio and Regkinio. The municipality has an area of 339.0 km2, the municipal unit Kamena Vourla (the pre-2011 municipality) has an area of 117.9 km2.

Population

The population of the municipality Kamena Vourla was 12,090 in 2011, of which 4,728 in the municipal unit Kamena Vourla and 2,976 in the town proper.

Springs and monastery

The famous springs became important around 1926 when the chemist Michail Pertesis discovered the exceptionally high radon concentration in the water, which was thought of as a great value for people's health.  Nearly ten years later (1930s), the first hotels started to develop.  After World War II, Kamena Vourla was transformed into a tourist attraction.

Eight km away on the road heading uphill features the monastery known as Iera Moni Metamorfoseos tou Sotiros which was built in around the 11th century.  Nearby the city a historic tomb is situated, a monument to the Battle of Thermopylae with a seal of Leonidas, King of Sparta, located not far from the mountain village Karya.

References

External links
 Official website
 kammenavourla.gr, Kamena Vourla portal & guide
 kamena-vourla.gr, Kamena Vourla hot springs information, facilities, directions, near destinations

Municipalities of Central Greece
Populated places in Phthiotis
Spa towns in Greece